HC Yunost-Minsk (Belar. Юнацтва Менск, Junactva Miеnsk) is a Belarusian ice hockey team that plays in the Belarusian Extraleague. They play their home games at Chizhovka-Arena, located in Minsk.

Yunost is the ten-times champion of Belarus, most recently in the 2020/2021 season. They won the Belarusian league three years in a row thrice: in 2003/2004, 2004/2005, and 2005/2006; 2008/2009, 2009/2010, and 2010/2011; as well as 2018/2019, 2019/2020, and 2020/2021.

They played in the Russian Supreme Hockey League during the 2012–13 season. Yunost's place in the Belarusian Extraleague was taken by its reserve team.

Since 2012, it has been a feeder team of the KHL club Dinamo Minsk.

Achievements 

 Belarus
Belarusian Extraleague:
  Winners (10) : 2004, 2005, 2006, 2009, 2010, 2011, 2016, 2019, 2020, 2021
Belarus Cup:
  Winners (6) : 2004,  2009, 2010, 2013, 2015, 2019

 Soviet Union
 BSSR League:
  Winners (1) : 1980

 Europe
Continental Cup:
  Winners (3) : 2007, 2011, 2018

External links
Official website

1991 establishments in Belarus
Ice hockey teams in Belarus
Ice hockey clubs established in 1991
Sport in Minsk